Mitani Station (三谷駅) is the name of two train stations in Japan:

 Mitani Station (Okayama)
 Mitani Station (Yamaguchi)